Setamiyeh-ye Kuchek (also Romanized as Setāmīyeh-ye Kūchek; also known as Sattamiyeh and Settāmīyeh) is a village in Esmailiyeh Rural District, in the Central District of Ahvaz County, Khuzestan Province, Iran. At the 2006 census, its population was 157, in 33 families.

References 

Populated places in Ahvaz County